Jainism has been engaged in debates with the other philosophical and religious traditions, in which its theories and its followers' practices have been questioned and challenged.

Criticism of doctrines

Karma 
The Jain theory of Karma has been challenged from an early time by the Vedanta and  branches of Hindu philosophy.
In particular, Vedanta Hindus considered the Jain position on the supremacy and potency of karma, specifically its insistence on non-intervention by any Supreme Being in regard to the fate of souls, as nāstika or atheistic. 
For example, in a commentary to the Brahma Sutras (III, 2, 38, and 41), Adi Sankara argues that the original karmic actions themselves cannot bring about the proper results at some future time; neither can super sensuous, non-intelligent qualities like adrsta—an unseen force being the metaphysical link between work and its result—by themselves mediate the appropriate, justly deserved pleasure and pain. The fruits, according to him, then, must be administered through the action of a conscious agent, namely, a supreme being (Ishvara).

Jainism's strong emphasis on the doctrine of karma and intense asceticism was also criticised by the Buddhists. Thus, the Saṃyutta Nikāya narrates the story of Asibandhakaputta, a headman who was originally a disciple of Māhavīra. He debates the Buddha, telling him that, according to Māhavīra (Nigaṇṭha Nātaputta), a man's fate or karma is decided by what he does habitually. The Buddha responds, considering this view to be inadequate, stating that even a habitual sinner spends more time "not doing the sin" and only some time actually "doing the sin".

In another Buddhist text Majjhima Nikāya, the Buddha criticizes Jain emphasis on the destruction of unobservable and unverifiable types of karma as a means to end suffering, rather than on eliminating evil mental states such as greed, hatred and delusion, which are observable and verifiable. Buddha also criticises the Jain ascetic practice of various austerities, claiming that he, Buddha, is happier when not practising the austerities.

While admitting the complexity and sophistication of the Jain doctrine, Padmanabh Jaini compares it with that of Hindu doctrine of rebirth and points out that the Jain seers are silent on the exact moment and mode of rebirth, that is, the re-entry of soul in womb after the death. The concept of nitya-nigoda, which states that there are certain categories of souls who have always been nigodas, is also criticized. According to Jainism, nigodas are lowest form of extremely microscopic beings having momentary life spans, living in colonies and pervading the entire universe. According to Jains, the entire concept of nitya-nigoda undermines the concept of karma, as these beings clearly would not have had prior opportunity to perform any karmically meaningful actions.

Jain Karma is also questioned on the grounds that it leads to the dampening of spirits, with men suffering the ills of life because the course of one's life is determined by karma. It is often maintained that the impression of karma as the accumulation of a mountain of bad deeds looming over our heads without any recourse leads to fatalism. However, as Paul Dundas puts it, the Jain theory of karma does not imply lack of free will or operation of total deterministic control over destinies. Furthermore, the doctrine of karma does not promote fatalism among its believers on account of belief in personal responsibility of actions and that austerities could expiate the evil karmas and it was possible to attain salvation by emulating the life of the Jinas.

Anekantavada
The doctrines of anekāntavāda and syādavāda are criticized on the grounds that they engender a degree of hesitancy and uncertainty, and may compound problems rather than solve them. Critics submit Jain epistemology asserts its own doctrines, but is unable to deny contradictory doctrines, and is therefore self-defeating. It is argued that if reality is so complex that no single doctrine can describe it adequately, then anekāntavāda itself, being a single doctrine, must be inadequate. This criticism seems to have been anticipated by Ācārya Samantabhadra who said: "From the point of view of pramana (means of knowledge) it is anekānta (multi-sided), but from a point of view of naya (partial view) it is ekanta (one-sided)."

In defense of the doctrine, Jains point out that anekāntavāda seeks to reconcile apparently opposing viewpoints rather than refuting them.

Anekāntavāda received much criticism from the Vedantists, notably Adi Sankarācārya (9th century C.E.). Sankara argued against some tenets of Jainism in his bhasya on Brahmasutra (2:2:33–36). His main arguments center on anekāntavāda:

However, many believe that Sankara fails to address genuine anekāntavāda. Many authors like Pandya believe that Sankara overlooked that, the affirmation of the existence of an object is in respect to the object itself, and its negation is in respect to what the object is not. Genuine anekāntavāda thus considers positive and negative attributes of an object, at the same time, and without any contradictions.

Another Buddhist logician Dharmakirti ridiculed anekāntavāda in Pramānavarttikakārika: "With the differentiation removed, all things have dual nature. Then, if somebody is implored to eat curd, then why he does not eat camel?" The insinuation is obvious; if curd exists from the nature of curd and does not exist from the nature of a camel, then one is justified in eating camel, as by eating camel, he is merely eating the negation of curd. Ācārya Akalanka, while agreeing that Dharmakirti may be right from one viewpoint, took it upon himself to issue a rejoinder:

Criticism of religious practices

Bal diksha
Bal diksha or the induction of minors in monastic order is criticised as violation of children's rights. Several child rights activists and government agencies questioned the practice and intervened in some instances. Several Jain institutions see this as an interference in religious matter. The legality of the issue was discussed in the courts and the Gujarat high court advised the state and central government to bring legislation to curb the practice. Since 1955, four attempts to get a legislative bill against Bal diksha passed in Parliament have failed. The gazette notification of July 13, 2009, stating that Bal Diksha as practiced in Jainism does not come under the provisions or the jurisdiction of the Juvenile Justice Act was celebrated but later found forged and a case was filed for forgery.

Sallekhana
Sallekhana is the religious vow of gradually reducing the intake of food and liquids observed by terminally ill or old Jain disciples. It is widely called fasting unto death as there is a reduction in food intake. It is practiced with the approval of Jain monks and can last over 12 years or more. It was petitioned that Rajasthan High Court should declare the practice illegal. In response, the Jain community said that the practice was a religious activity which was protected under article 25 of the Indian constitution. In August 2015, Rajasthan High Court cited that the practice is not an essential tenet of Jainism and banned the practice, making it punishable under section 306 and 309 IPC (Abetment of Suicide). But a few days later, The Supreme Court of India stayed the High Court's order.

Status of women
Jainism includes women in their fourfold sangha, the religious order of Jain laymen, laywomen, monks and nuns. The early Shvetambar scriptures imposed restrictions on pregnant women, young women or those who have a small child, to enter to the ranks of nuns. Regardless, the number of nuns given in those texts were always double the number of monks. Parshvanatha and Mahavira, two historical Tirthankars of Jainism, had huge numbers of female devotees and ascetics. Moreover, the restrictions on certain women to enter ranks of nuns were not attributable to Jainism alone, but the erstwhile patriarchal Indian society as a whole.

According to the Svetambara's scriptures such as Chhedasutra, women were given lesser authority than their male counterparts. Commentaries state that this is because things which could endanger the vow of chastity should be avoided. Nalini Balbir writes that the belief that women are more fragile than men were all-pervading in these texts.

The Digambar sect of Jainism believes that women must be reborn as men in order to achieve liberation. Digambars maintain that women cannot take higher vows of ascetic renunciation.

The Swetambar sect, however, disagrees with this position, holding that one of the Tirthankars, Mallinath, was a woman and even today the majority of Swetambar monastics are female.

Notes

References

Sources

 
 
 
 
 
 
 
 
 
 
 
 
 
 
 
 
 

Jainism
Jainism